John H. McCunn (November 2, 1820 – July 6, 1872) was born Burnally, Limavady, County Londonderry, Ireland on 2 November 1820 son of William McCunn and Martha [Matty] McKinley. He belonged to a poor Irish immigrant family who arrived in New York City in the 19th century. He worked as a dockhand before training as a lawyer, and eventually becoming a judge. When the American Civil War began in 1861 he joined the Union Army as a Captain in the 69th New York Infantry Regiment before he recruited the 37th New York Infantry which he commanded as colonel. At war's end he was brevetted Brigadier General. He was a member of the infamous Tweed Ring, which he aided by naturalising new citizens to boost his election rolls. On one day alone, he naturalised over 2,000 new voters. However, when the scandal was uncovered, he was impeached and removed from office.

References

“Making An Example of Two Naughty Boys” at Harpweek  May 25, 1872 Frank Bellew
(page 269) Boss Tweed: The Rise and Fall of the Corrupt Pol Who Conceived the Soul of Modern New York By Kenneth D. Ackerman Published 2005 Carroll & Graf

American judges
Union Army colonels
People of New York (state) in the American Civil War
Irish emigrants to the United States (before 1923)
Irish soldiers in the United States Army
19th-century Irish people
1820 births
1872 deaths
Leaders of Tammany Hall
19th-century American judges